The 1954 season was the 49th season of competitive football in Norway.

1953–54 league season

Hovedserien

Group A

Group B

Championship final
June 27: Fredrikstad-Skeid 2-1

Landsdelsserien

Group Østland/Søndre

Group Østland/Nordre

Group Sørland/Vestland, A1

Group Sørland/Vestland, A2

Group Sørland/Vestland, B

Group Møre

Group Trøndelag

Play-off Sørland/Vestland
Flekkefjord - Bryne 1-0

Brann - Flekkefjord 6-0 (agg. 7-0)

Brann promoted.

Play-off Møre/Trøndelag
Ranheim - Molde 2-0

Ranheim promoted.

First Division

District I
 1. Rapid (Promoted)
 2. Greåker
 3. Torp
 4. Hafslund
 5. Mysen
 6. Sprint
 7. Østsiden
 8. Rakkestad

District II; Group A
 1. Vestfossen (Play-off)
 2. Drammens BK
 3. Mjøndalen
 4. Drafn
 5. Steinberg
 6. Jevnaker
 7. Strømsgodset
 8. Kongsberg

District II, Group B
 1. Spartacus (Play-off)
 2. Aurskog
 3. Sandaker
 4. Stabæk
 5. Aasen
 6. Grei
 7. Kongsvinger
 8. Funnefoss

District III
 1. Gjøvik/Lyn (Play-off)
 2. Hamar IL
 3. Fremad
 4. Brumunddal
 5. Mesna
 6. Vang
 7. Vardal
 8. Einastrand

District IV, Group A
 1. Tønsberg Turn (Play-off)
 2. Skiens BK
 3. Borre
 4. Sem
 5. Kragerø
 6. Brevik
 7. Borg
 8. Flint

District IV, Group B
 1. Storm (Play-off)
 2. Herkules
 3. Urædd
 4. Rjukan
 5. Drangedal
 6. Ulefoss
 7. Tollnes
 8. Skiens-Grane

District V, Group A1 (Aust-Agder)
 1. Grane (Arendal) (Play-off)
 2. Arendals BK
 3. Nedenes
 4. Rygene
 5. Risør
 6. Dristug

District V, Group A2 (Vest-Agder)
 1. Mandalskam. (Play-off)
 2. Vigør
 3. Farsund
 4. Torridal
 5. Vindbjart

DistrictV, Group B1 (Rogaland)
 1. Ulf (Promoted)
 2. Klepp
 3. Egersund
 4. Varhaug
 5. Randaberg
 6. Vigrestad

District V, Group B2 (Rogaland)
 1. Vidar (Promoted)
 2. Haugar
 3. Jarl
 4. Torvastad
 5. Vaulen
 6. Brodd

District VI, Group A (Bergen)
 1. Nymark (Play-off)
 2. Laksevåg
 3. Hardy
 4. Trane
 5. Bergens-Sparta
 6. Viggo
 7. Minde

District VI, Group B (Midthordland)
 1. Florvåg (Play-off)
 2. Erdal
 3. Fana
 4. Ålvik
 5. Eidsvåg (Åsane)
 6. Dale (Dalekvam) 
 7. Kjøkkelvik

District VII, Group A (Sunnmøre/Romsdal)
 1. Sykkylven (Promoted)
 2. Spjelkavik
 3. Aksla
 4. Hovdebygda
 5. Skarbøvik
 6. Volda
 7. Velledalen
 8. Åndalsnes

District VII, Group B (Nordmøre/Romsdal)
 1. Clausenengen (Promoted)
 2. Braatt
 3. Træff
 4. Goma
 5. Nordlandet
 6. Averøykam.
 7. Sunndal
 8. Olymp

District VIII, Group A1 (Sør-Trøndelag)
 1. Hommelvik (Play-off)
 2. Heimdal
 3. Steinar
 4. Leik
 5. Flå
 6. Melhus

District VIII, Group A2 (Sør-Trøndelag)
 1. Troll (Play-off)
 2. Orkanger
 3. Løkken
 4. Svorkmo
 5. Dalguten
 6. Oppdal

District VIII, Group B (Trondheim og omegn)
 1. Rosenborg (Play-off)
 2. Tryggkameratene
 3. National
 4. Nidar
 5. Trond
 6. Ørn (Trondheim)
 7. Strindheim

District VIII, Group C (Fosen)
 1. Opphaug (Play-off)
 2. Beian
 3. Stadsbygd
 4. Lensvik
 5. Rissa
 6. Fevåg (withdrew)

District VIII, Group D (Nord-Trøndelag/Namdal)
 1. Nessegutten 
 2. Verdal (Play-off)
 3. Stjørdal
 4. Malm
 5. Namsos
 6. Varden (Meråker)
 7. Skogn
 8. Blink

Play-off District II/III
Spartacus - Vestfossen 1-2

Vestfossen - Gjøvik/Lyn 2-2

Gjøvik/Lyn - Spartacus 1-1

Table

Championship District II
Spartacus - Vestfossen 1-2

Play-off District IV
Tønsberg Turn - Storm 2-0

Storm - Tønsberg Turn 0-1 (agg. 0-3)

Tønsberg Turn promoted.

Play-off District V
Grane - Mandalskameratene 3-0

Mandalskameratene - Grane 1-1 (agg. 1-4)

Grane (Arendal) promoted.

Championship District V
Ulf - Vidar 2-0

Vidar - Ulf 1-5 (agg. 1-7)

Grane - Ulf 0-2 (in Flekkefjord)

Play-off District VI
Nymark - Florvåg 2-1

Nymark promoted.

Championship District VIII
Sykkylven - Clausenengen 3-0 (in Molde)

Play-off District VIII
Rosenborg - Verdal 1-0

Hommelvik - Opphaug 2-1

Verdal - Hommelvik 3-0

Opphaug - Rosenborg 0-3

Rosenborg - Hommelvik 1-2

Verdal - Opphaug 7-0

Relegation play-off District II
Grei - Jevnaker 1-3

Jevnaker - Grei 2-1 (agg. 5-2)

Grei relegated.

Relegation play-off District IV
Borg - Tollnes 3-2

Tollnes relegated.

Norwegian Cup

Final

Northern Norwegian Cup

Final

National team

Note: Norway's goals first

  
Seasons in Norwegian football